Lake Viljandi is a lake in Viljandi County, Estonia. The lake is in the deep primeval valley of the Viljandi town, depth , length , width , and surface area . The Uueveski and Valuoja streams and a number of springs flow into the lake. From the south-western part of the lake the Raudna River flows out. The main fish in the lake are bream, roach, perch and pike. The lake and its shores make up the Viljandi landscape protection area.

The Grand Race around Lake Viljandi is held annually.

Gallery

References

External links

Viljandi
Viljandi
Viljandi
Tourist attractions in Viljandi County